Brick Tavern Stand, also known as Clawson House, is a historic inn and tavern located at Montour Falls in Schuyler County, New York. It was built in 1828 and is a two-story, five bay Federal style brick structure featuring a recessed entrance.  Built originally as a tavern on the stagecoach lines of the Finger Lakes Region, it was later modified for use as Bethesda Sanitarium and operated by Dr. Charles Deland Clawson.  In 1974, it became home to the Schuyler County Historical Society.

It was listed on the National Register of Historic Places on November 4, 1994.

References

External links
Schuyler County Historical Society website

Hotel buildings on the National Register of Historic Places in New York (state)
Federal architecture in New York (state)
Commercial buildings completed in 1828
Historic house museums in New York (state)
Museums in Schuyler County, New York
Drinking establishments on the National Register of Historic Places in New York (state)
Taverns in New York (state)
National Register of Historic Places in Schuyler County, New York
Taverns on the National Register of Historic Places in New York (state)